Lev Vladimirovich Shatilo (born 21 October 1962) is a Russian former javelin thrower for the Soviet Union, who is best known for finishing fifth (81.02 metres) at the 1987 World Championships in Rome, Italy. In 1992 he was the first national champion of Russia since independence.

He also placed third in the javelin at the 1992 CIS Winter Throwing Championships.

International competitions

National titles
Russian Athletics Championships
Javelin throw: 1992

See also
List of javelin throw national champions (men)

References

Year List

1962 births
Living people
Athletes from Moscow
Russian male javelin throwers
Soviet male javelin throwers
World Athletics Championships athletes for the Soviet Union
Russian Athletics Championships winners